The Meadows is a residential district in  the City of Edmonton, Alberta, Canada. Located in southeast Edmonton, The Meadows is bounded by Whitemud Drive (Highway 14) to the north, 34 Street to the west, and Anthony Henday Drive (Highway 216) to the east and south.  The residential district of Mill Woods is immediately west of The Meadows across 34 Street, while Strathcona County is located to the east across Anthony Henday Drive.

The community is represented by The Meadows Community League, established in 1987.

Neighbourhoods 
The Meadows Area Structure Plan planned for seven separate neighbourhoods. The Meadows area includes the following:
Aster;
Larkspur;
Laurel;
Maple;
Silver Berry;
Tamarack; and
Wild Rose.

The naming theme applied to neighbourhoods within The Meadows area are "Trees, Flowers, and Plants Native to Alberta".

Land use plans 
In addition to The Meadows Area Structure Plan, the following plans were adopted to further guide development of certain portions of The Meadows area:
the Aster Neighbourhood Structure Plan (NSP) in 2016, which applies to the Aster neighbourhood;
the Larkspur NSP in 1987, which applies to the Larkspur neighbourhood;
the Laurel NSP in 2007, which applies to the Laurel neighbourhood;
the Maple NSP in 2010, which applies to the Maple neighbourhood;
the Silver Berry NSP in 1994, which applies to the Silver Berry neighbourhood;
the Tamarack NSP in 2006, which applies to the Tamarack neighbourhood; and
the Wild Rose NSP in 1998, which applies to the Wild Rose neighbourhood.

Schools 
The Meadows is home to the following five schools.
Velma E. Baker Elementary School (kindergarten through grade 6 in Larkspur)
Father Michael Troy Catholic Junior High School (grades 7-9 in Wild Rose)
A. Blair McPherson School (kindergarten through grade 9 in Tamarack)
Svend Hansen School (kindergarten through grade 9 in Laurel) 
Thelma Chalifoux School (grade 7 through 9 in Larkspur)
Edmonton Public Schools plans on building a senior high school near the Meadows Recreation Centre.

Amenities 
RioCan Meadows is a commercial development at the southwest corner of Whitemud Drive and 17 Street on the northern edge of The Meadows. It features retailers of varying sizes and includes anchors such as Best Buy, Home Depot, and Real Canadian Superstore. A smaller commercial development is located in the central portion of The Meadows on 23 Avenue.  It includes a Save-On-Foods and numerous small retailers. Directly east of RioCan Meadows is another similar sized commercial development under Dream Centres. It is being developed in three sections, Edmonton Tamarack SE, Edmonton Tamarack NE, and Edmonton Tamarack N. The largest store include, GoodLife Fitness, Walmart Super Center, and a Shoppers Drug Mart. With many smaller stores within the same area

Southeast of Silver Berry in Meadows District Park, The Meadows Community Recreation Centre & The Meadows Library opened on December 5, 2014. The Meadows Community Recreation Centre amenities include, Aquatic Centre, Fitness Centre, Gymnasium, 2 NHL-sized arenas, and Outdoor Sport Fields along with program's corresponding to them.

Meadows Transit Centre 

The Meadows Transit Centre is located on 17 street and Tamarack Way. This transit centre has many amenities including park & ride, a drop off area, public washrooms, a large shelter, vending machines and a pay phone. The transit centre was opened in April 2010 at a construction cost of $12 million.

The following bus routes serve the transit centre:

See also 
 Edmonton Transit Service
 Edmonton Federation of Community Leagues

References 

Neighbourhoods in Edmonton
Edmonton Transit Service transit centres